Robertville may refer to:
Robertville, Belgium
Robertville, New Brunswick
Robertville, South Carolina